Suomy (pronounced su-oh-mee) is an Italian brand of motorcycle helmets.

Since its foundation in 1997, the activity of the Italian company has been strictly oriented towards the racing world, which offers valuable insights and information for the development and creation of helmets.
In 2000, Suomy signed a partnership agreement with Ducati, one of the leading motorcycle manufacturers in the racing world. Thanks to this collaboration, the most talented Ducati riders engaged in the Superbike World Championship start using Suomy helmets.

In 2001 Suomy achieved the first important result, winning the first World Title with Troy Bayliss, a legend of the SBK World Championship. He confirmed his World Title in 2006 and 2008 too. During the same years Suomy sponsors riders of the caliber of Troy Corser, Aaron Slight, Ben Bostrom , Scott Russell and Ruben Xaus. Subsequently, Neil Hodgson in 2003 and James Toseland in 2004 and 2007 will be proclaimed SBK World Champions.

In 2003 Suomy became the lead actor in the 250 GP Championship with Manuel Poggiali‘s World victory. The 2000s are also characterized by Suomy’s debut in the MotoGP World Championship thanks to the sponsorship of two icons of the worldwide motorcycling: Loris Capirossi and Max Biaggi. And the “Corsaro”, during his long history as a Suomy ambassador, won two SBK World Championships in 2010 and 2012.

Thanks to both these victories and the recognizability of its racing graphics, Suomy immediately becomes a premium brand synonymous with reliability and high performance, recognized by both professional riders and motorcycle enthusiasts.
The Italian brand continues its growth, making progress with important technological investments and developing a top-notch Design and R&D department based in Italy.
And, while Suomy’s wall of fame continues to fill up with unforgettable successes in the racing world by winning more than 20 World Titles, year by year the helmets’ collection gets enlarged and improved, enriching itself with a wide range of models, from the track to off-road, passing through sport touring and jets.

2014 is a fundamental year for Suomy, which is acquired by a prestigious private investment fund that takes ownership of the brand.
Thus the collaboration between SUOMY and KYT, top brand of an important Indonesian production group that holds 70% of the Asian market, takes shape. This is how new growth prospects are born, triggered by a two-way exchange of information between the two companies.
The production department moves overseas, but the Design, R&D, marketing and sales departments, as well as a large part of the raw materials and components of the helmets, remain Made In Italy.
The company’s growth is increasingly tangible and new sponsorship projects are born in all the racing sectors, from MotoGP to Isle of Man TT, from MXGP to Dakar.
The modern history of Suomy Riders boasts talents as Andrea Dovizioso, Francesco Bagnaia in MotoGP, Peter Hickman and Gary Johnson in the road racing.

2018 has been announced as the new Suomy Era.
Suomy introduced on the worldwide market SR-GP, the racing helmet that raises the bar of high performance, taking known standards to new levels.
The design, a synthesis of a deep and integrated study aimed at achieving ultimate performance, was done with crucial contribution of the top level MotoGp and Road Racing riders since the concept phases.

In 2019 Matteo Ferrari and in 2020 Enea Bastianini respectively won the MotoE and Moto2 world championships wearing SR-GP.

In July 2022 Suomy Helmets has the great pleasure to announce the return of a true champion, Troy Bayliss, as Suomy Ambassador, who wears SR-GP.

In November 2022 Suomy Helmets gets on top of the world as Francesco Bagnaia conquers the title of MotoGP World Champion by wearing SR-GP.

References

External links

Suomy Helmets official web site

Motorcycle helmet manufacturers
Manufacturing companies of Italy
Italian brands